Bailamos may refer to:

 "Bailamos" (Enrique Iglesias song), a 1999 song by Enrique Iglesias
 "Bailamos", a 2006 song by Fergie, written for the film Poseidon